USS SC-1012 was a submarine chaser in the United States Navy during World War II.

SC-1012 was built by the Fellows & Stewart Shipbuilders and launched on 28 December 1942. Commissioned on 18 August 1943. She was involved in several campaigns during World War II and traveled many miles across and throughout the South Pacific escorting convoys, providing Harbormaster duties and pre-invasion reconnaissance.

Service history
In February 1944, SC-1012 was in a convoy when  was torpedoed. The escort ships,  and  along with SC-1012, formed a Hunter-Killer group and began a systematic search for the submarine which had torpedoed her. No confirmed kill was recorded, but no further offensive action was seen from the submarine.

During the SC-1012s Harbormaster duties, in the Keramerati Island Group, they had just escorted an ammunition ship to dock; when SC-1012 was targeted by a kamikaze. The crew was at battle stations and had just prepared to open fire when the pilot, apparently spotting a better target, broke off his attack and slammed into the ammunition ship, which burned for three or four days.

During the pre-invasion reconnaissance of the islands, Col. "Squeeky" Anderson was the commanding officer for the landing forces. He would routinely board SC-1012 and go with them to map out the landing zones. During the actual invasion, SC-1012 would stand by at a preset location and the landing craft would then home in on her, aiming to the right or the left of where SC-1012 was stationed. This type of "spotting" enabled the landing ships to hit their target without using any other guidance systems.

SC-1012 did not lose any crewmembers to any sort of enemy action. However, she was damaged beyond repair when Typhoon Louise hit the Seaplane Base on Okinawa in October 1945, and the SC-1012 was destroyed on 1 January 1946.

References

External links
 
  Patrol Craft Sailors Association: WWII submarine chasers

SC-497-class submarine chasers
Ships built in Los Angeles
1942 ships